P79 may refer to:
 , a submarine of the Royal Navy
 , a corvette of the Indian Navy
 Northrop XP-79, an American experimental fighter aircraft
 P79 road (Latvia)
 Papyrus 79, a biblical manuscript